Adamantios Olympios Nikolaou (1790 – January 19, 1856), better known as Captain Diamantis was a klepht and an armatolos from Pieria.

Biography 
Born in Ryakia, Diamantis Nikolaou Olympian was the eldest son of the great armatolos and klepht Raideniotis (Ryakiotis) Olympios, best known as Nikolas Kateriniotis Olympios. He operated in the mountains of Vermio, Olympus and Pieria before 1821 and after the outbreak of the Revolution. The interim government and the Supreme Court because of his bravery and military skill appointed him commander of Evia and Eastern Greece. He successfully confronted the Turks in Evia and in the battle of Faucets. In 1829, as shown in the paroikoi Skopelos records (2 April 1829) he was with his family on the island of Skopelos. In July 1829 he represented Thessalomakedones fighters in the Fourth National Assembly at Argos and offers to Kapodistrias their proxy. By decision of King Otto, he was appointed senator on June 16, 1844 in the Senate body.

References 
The first version of the article is translated and is based from the article at the Greek Wikipedia (el:Main Page)

Macedonian revolutionaries (Greek)
1790 births
1856 deaths
Greek people of the Greek War of Independence
19th-century Greek people
People from Pieria (regional unit)
Greek people from the Ottoman Empire